Florescu is a Romanian surname. Notable people with the surname include:
Alexandru Emanoil Florescu, politician
Bonifaciu Florescu, polygraph and politician
Gheorghe Florescu, footballer
Ion Emanuel Florescu (1819–1893), general and Prime Minister of Romania
Jean Lorin Florescu, actor
Mihail Florescu, chemist
Radu Florescu (1925-2014), Romanian historian
Stefan Florescu (1926/1927 – 2010), American paralympic swimmer and table tennis player
Victor Florescu (born 1973), Moldovan judoka

See also 
Florea (name)
Florești (disambiguation)

References

Romanian-language surnames
Patronymic surnames